BQL may refer to:

 BQL (group), a Slovene pop group
 Boulia Airport, Queensland, Australia (IATA code: BQL)